Bellville may refer to:

Argentina
 Bell Ville, Córdoba

South Africa
 Bellville, Western Cape
 Bellville railway station
United States
 Bellville, Georgia
 Bellville, Missouri
 Bellville, Ohio
 Bellville, Texas

See also
Belleville (disambiguation)
Belville (disambiguation)

nl:Belleville